Puerto Cabello is a city on the north coast of Venezuela. It is located in Carabobo State, about 210 km west of Caracas. As of 2011, the city had a population of around 182,400. The city is home to the largest and busiest port in the country and is thus a vital cog in the country's vast oil industry. The word 'cabello' translates to 'hair'. The Spaniards took to saying that the sea was so calm there that a ship could be secured to the dock by tying it with a single hair.

History

The foundation date of Puerto Cabello is not known although its name was documented for the first time on the map of the province of Caracas prepared in 1578 by Juan de Pimentel.

Puerto Cabello's location made it an easy prey to buccaneers and was a popular trading post for Dutch smugglers during the 17th century. Most of the contraband trade consisted of cocoa with neighboring island Curaçao, colonized by the Dutch. Puerto Cabello was also at that time under Dutch control.

It was not until 1730 that the Spanish took over the port, after the Real Compañía Guipuzcoana had moved in. This company built warehouses, wharves and an array of forts to protect the harbor.

During the War of Jenkins' Ear, Puerto Cabello was the careening port of the Company, whose ships had rendered great assistance to the Spanish navy in carrying troops, arms, stores and ammunition from Spain to her colonies, and its destruction was a severe blow to both the Company and the Spanish government. The commodore Charles Knowles in command of the 70-gun  in 1743 received orders to carry out attacks on the Spanish settlements at Puerto Cabello and La Guaira. The Spanish governor Gabriel de Zuluaga, well informed of the plans, recruited extra defenders and acquired gunpowder from the Dutch. Consequently, at an attack on La Guaira, on 18 February 1743, the English fleet was beaten off by the defenders. Knowles withdrew his force and refitted at Curaçao before attempting an assault on Puerto Cabello on April 15, and again on April 24, but both assaults were beaten back. Knowles called off the expedition and returned to Jamaica.

By the 1770s, Puerto Cabello had come to be the most fortified town on the Venezuelan coast. The San Felipe castle and the Solano fortress remain from the period. The frigate Santa Cecilia (former ), under the command of Captain Don Ramón de Chalas, sat in Puerto Cabello until Captain Edward Hamilton, aboard , cut her out of the harbour on October 25, 1799. The Spanish casualties included 120 dead; the British took 231 Spaniards prisoner, while another 15 jumped or fell overboard. Eleven of Hamilton's men were injured, four seriously, but none was killed. Hamilton himself was severely wounded.

The forces of the First Republic of Venezuela briefly held San Felipe castle. In 1812 Simón Bolívar, then a colonel in the independentist forces, was appointed commandante of Puerto Cabello. He left after a royalist rebellion broke out. In 1821 the Spanish retreated to the castle after their defeat at the decisive Battle of Carabobo.

Puerto Cabello was the last Spanish royalist stronghold during Venezuela's war for independence, it was captured by José Antonio Páez on November 8, 1823. The harbour came under Anglo-German attack in the Venezuelan crisis of 1902–03 and according to press reports was left in ruins.

In 1962, Puerto Cabello was the site of an uprising, known as El Porteñazo, by pro-Fidel Castro naval officers, marines, and members of the FALN. Although loyalist naval forces were able to quickly take back the base and arrest the rebels, they were unable to prevent the marines from occupying the city and arming pro-Castro forces. Despite ambushes and bloody house-to-house fighting, loyal National Guard and mechanized regular forces were able to retake Puerto Cabello.

With the ongoing crisis amid food shortages on 23 February 2019 that coupled with economic damage, the aid that was supposed to arrive at the port was turned away by the Bolivarian Navy of Venezuela, threatening to "open fire" at it, forcing the aid to redirect back to Puerto Rico.

Geography
Puerto Cabello is located in Carabobo State, about 210 km west of Caracas.

Climate
Puerto Cabello has a borderline tropical savanna climate (Köppen Aw), almost dry enough to be a hot semi-arid climate (BSh) as prevails further west on the Caribbean coast of Venezuela.

Tourism

Attractions
 Protestants Graveyard.
 Solano Fortress (part of the San Esteban National Park)
 San Felipe Castle.
 Long Island.
 Puente de Los Españoles (San Esteban Pueblo).
 Teatro Municipal

Notable people
 José Altuve, Major League Baseball player for the Houston Astros.
 Pablo Sandoval, Mexican League player for Olmecas de Tabasco.
 Fernando Nieve, former Major League Baseball player.
 Víctor Moreno, former Major League Baseball player.
 Félix Doubront, Mexican League player for Saraperos de Saltillo.
 Willson Contreras, Major League Baseball player for the St. Louis Cardinals.
 William Contreras, Major League Baseball player for the Milwaukee Brewers.
 Juan José Flores, military general, 1st, 3rd, and 4th President of Ecuador.
 Bartolomé Salom, military hero of the Venezuelan War of Independence.
 Italo Pizzolante, poet, writer, composer, singer, and engineer.
 Carlos Zambrano, former Major League Baseball player.

Transport
Puerto Cabello is served by a station on the Instituto de Ferrocarriles del Estado network.

Economy
Despite the Puerto Cabello's once bustling port, port traffic disappeared when the price of oil collapsed, which affected the country that was dependent on imports paid for with the high price of oil. As part of the Venezuelan crisis, many of the poorer citizens in "shantytowns" in Puerto Cabello now struggle for food. Citizens wait in long lines to buy government-mandated priced groceries and the currency (bolivar) experienced nearly 64% depreciation as of May, 2017. As of August 2017, the depreciation percentage was as much as 94%.

The UCOCAR shipyards are in Puerto Cabello and have been awarded contracts to construct patrol vessels for the Venezuelan Navy.

See also
 Venezuela
 Carabobo State
 List of cities in Venezuela
 Railway stations in Venezuela

References

External links 

 World Press Photo of the Year award winner from 1962 rebellion.

 
Cities in Carabobo
Cabello
Cabello
Cabello
Populated places established in the 16th century